Mailam is a state assembly constituency in Tamil Nadu, India, that was formed after constituency delimitations in 2007. Its State Assembly Constituency number is 71. Located in Viluppuram district, it comprises portions of the Gingee and Tindivanam taluks. It is included in the Arani constituency for national elections to the Parliament of India. It is one of the 234 State Legislative Assembly Constituencies in Tamil Nadu in India.

Election results

2021

2016

2011

See also 
Delimitation Commission of India

References 

Assembly constituencies of Tamil Nadu
Viluppuram district